Motlatsi Maseela (born 1 October 1971) is a Lesotho sprinter. He competed in the men's 4 × 400 metres relay at the 1996 Summer Olympics.

References

1971 births
Living people
Athletes (track and field) at the 1996 Summer Olympics
Lesotho male sprinters
Olympic athletes of Lesotho
Athletes (track and field) at the 1994 Commonwealth Games
Commonwealth Games competitors for Lesotho
Place of birth missing (living people)